Giuseppe Parodi (17 December 1892 – 1 March 1984) was an Italian footballer who played as a midfielder. He competed for Italy in the men's football tournament at the 1920 Summer Olympics.

References

External links

1892 births
1984 deaths
Italian footballers
Italy international footballers
Olympic footballers of Italy
Footballers at the 1920 Summer Olympics
People from Vercelli
Association football midfielders
Casale F.B.C. players
F.C. Pro Vercelli 1892 players
Footballers from Piedmont
Sportspeople from the Province of Vercelli